Barangaroo was the second wife of Bennelong, who was interlocutor between the Aboriginal people and the early British colonists in New South Wales.  Barangaroo was a member of the Cammeraygal clan. While Bennelong spent considerable time in the British settlement in Sydney, Barangaroo maintained her way of life with her people.

She had two children prior to being Bennelong's wife, both of whom died.  She had a baby girl, Dilboong, while she was Bennelong's wife. The baby only survived for a few months. Barangaroo died in 1791 and was buried in Governor Phillip's garden, in the area of the present day Circular Quay.

The accounts of Watkin Tench 
First Fleet marine Watkin Tench, in his first-hand account called A Complete Account of the Settlement at Port Jackson, describes several encounters with Barangaroo.

At the first meeting between the colonists and Barangaroo in October 1790 he describes how Bennelong presents her wearing a petticoat.  "But this was the prudery of the wilderness, which her husband (Bennelong) joined us to ridicule, and we soon laughed her out of it.  The petticoat was dropped with hesitation, and Barangaroo stood 'armed cap-a-pee in nakedness'."  Tench said at the request of Bennelong "we combed and cut her hair, and she seemed pleased with the operation".  She would not taste any of the wine that she was offered, even though she was invited to do so by Bennelong.  

He also describes an occasion where a convict was flogged in front of an audience of Aboriginal people, for stealing from them.   Barangaroo was angry, and menaced the man performing the flogging with a stick.

His final mention of Barangaroo in the text is to describe how the Aboriginal women were treated with what he described as "savage barbarity", and that Bennelong would strike Barangaroo with blows and kicks and "every other mark of brutality".  He also says that Barangaroo was not pitied as a result of this, as she was "a scold and a vixen".

Legacy 
A  suburban area at Sydney's east Darling Harbour, not located in her traditional lands, was officially named in her honour in October 2006. The site was formerly a dockland precinct used for shipping, and has since been redeveloped into commercial office spaces, residences, a casino, hotel, and parklands. In 2008, part of the precinct, called The Hungry Mile, was the site of the Opening Mass and several other large gatherings for World Youth Day 2008.

The SS Barangaroo was a ferry operating across Sydney Harbour prior to the opening of the Sydney Harbour Bridge. Barangaroo Street in the Canberra suburb of Chisholm is named in her honour.

References

External links
  [CC-By-SA]

1791 deaths
Year of birth unknown
Eora people